James Monroe "Jack" Russell (August 29, 1919 – January 16, 2006) was an American football end.

Russell was born in Nemo, Texas in 1919 and attended Cleburne High School in Cleburne, Texas. He played college football at Baylor. During World War II, he served in the military and played on the 1944 Randolph Field Ramblers football team. In December 1944, he was named to the Associated Press 1944 All-Service football team.

After the war, he played professional football in the All-America Football Conference for the New York Yankees from 1946 to 1949 and in the National Football League for the New York Yanks in 1950. He appeared in 65 professional football games, 56 of them as a starter, and tallied 83 receptions for 1,331 yards and 15 touchdowns. He also played in the Canadian Football League for the Saskatchewan Roughriders from 1951 to 1952.

He died in 2006 in Cleburne, Texas.

References

1919 births
2006 deaths
People from Somervell County, Texas
Military personnel from Texas
American football ends
New York Yankees (AAFC) players
New York Yanks players
Illinois Fighting Illini football players
Players of American football from Illinois
United States Army Air Forces personnel of World War II